Thanda Safari is a five-star safari lodge at the heart of the Elephant Coast in Umkhanyakude District Municipality (KwaZulu-Natal), South Africa. The founders are Christin and Dan Olofsson from Malmö, Sweden. 
The word Thanda means love in Zulu language and the Thanda lodge operation is a celebration of the Zulu culture.
In 2009, Thanda made it to the top as The World’s Leading Luxury Lodge. The prize has been called the Oscar of the travel industry.

It is situated near the ocean and the bush, offering hotel guests a spa, star gazing and safaris to see the Big Five.
In 2009 the Thanda area was expanded with the land of King Goodwill Zwelithini kaBhekuzulu, and after the merger it comprises a total of 14,000 hectares of land. The area is home to black rhinoceros which is on the brink of extinction. It was moved to the area to secure its survival.

The firm is a member of The Leading Hotels of the World.

Social responsibility
The reserve supports projects that create jobs and protects the nature and wildlife as well as stopping the spreading of HIV/AIDS, including the JAC Initiative, Star for Life, the Thanda Foundation and the African Impact volunteer programme.

See also

 List of hotels in South Africa

Notes

External links
 Thanda's official website
 Sa-venues.com
 nature-reserve.co.za
 "The Leading Hotels of the World" about Thanda
 Nature Reserve about Thanda

Hotels in South Africa
Wildlife sanctuaries of South Africa
Protected areas of KwaZulu-Natal
Umkhanyakude District Municipality